The Ploștina is a left tributary of the river Motru in Romania. It discharges into the Motru in the town Motru.

References

Rivers of Romania
Rivers of Gorj County